VuFind is an open-source library search engine that allows users to search and browse beyond the resources of a traditional Online public access catalog (OPAC). Developed by Villanova University, version 1.0 was released in July 2010 after two years in beta.

VuFind operates with a simple interface and offers flexible keyword searching. While most commonly used for searching catalog records, VuFind can be extended to search other library resources including: locally cached journals, digital library items, and institutional repository and bibliography. The software is also modular and highly configurable, allowing implementers to choose system components to best fit their needs.

The project wiki lists around two hundred institutions running live or beta instances of VuFind including the Georgia Tech Library, the National Library of Ireland, Yale University, and the DC Public Library, as well as a dozen of instances run by finc in Germany.

Features 
VuFind offers a number of features that enhance usability:

Faceted search results that allow users to narrow items by format, call number, language, author, genre, era, region, and more
Suggested resources and searches
Browsing capability
Personal organization and annotation of resources through favorites lists, texting, e-mailing, tagging, and commenting features
Persistent URLs
APA or MLA citations
Author biographies
Multi-language capability with translations available in Brazilian Portuguese, Chinese, Czech, Dutch, English, French, German, Japanese, Spanish, Bengali (India) and more

References

External links
 
 Code repository

Free library and information science software
Free software programmed in PHP
Search engine software